Lieutenant Colonel Robert Blair Mayne,  (11 January 1915 – 14 December 1955), better known as Paddy Mayne, was a British Army officer from Newtownards, capped for Ireland and the British Lions at rugby union, lawyer, amateur boxer, and a founding member of the Special Air Service (SAS).

During the course of the Second World War, Mayne became one of the British Army's most highly decorated soldiers. He was controversially denied a Victoria Cross.

Early life and sporting achievements
Robert Blair "Paddy" Mayne was born in Newtownards, County Down, Ireland (now Northern Ireland), the sixth of seven children in a Protestant family. The Maynes were prominent landowners who owned several retail businesses in the town. He was named Robert Blair after a second cousin, who at the time of his birth was a British Army officer serving in the First World War. The family home, Mount Pleasant, is situated on the hills above Newtownards.

Mayne attended Regent House Grammar School. It was there that his talent for rugby union became evident, and he played for the school 1st XV and also the local Ards RFC team from the age of 16. While at school he also played cricket and golf, and showed aptitude as a marksman in the rifle club. On leaving school he studied law at Queen's University Belfast, studying to become a solicitor. While at university Mayne was an officer cadet with the Queen's University, Belfast Contingent, Officers' Training Corps.

While at university he took up boxing, becoming Irish Universities Heavyweight Champion in August 1936. He followed this by reaching the final of the British Universities Heavyweight Championship, but was beaten on points. With a handicap of 8, he won the Scrabo Golf Club President's Cup the next year.

Mayne's first full Ireland rugby cap also came in 1937, in a match against Wales. After gaining five more caps for Ireland as a lock forward, Mayne was selected for the 1938 British Lions tour to South Africa. While the Lions lost the first test, a South African newspaper stated Mayne was "outstanding in a pack which gamely and untiringly stood up to the tremendous task". He played in seventeen of the twenty provincial matches and in all three tests. On returning from South Africa, he joined Malone RFC in Belfast.

While on tour in South Africa with the Lions in 1938, Mayne's rambunctious nature came to the fore, smashing up colleagues' hotel rooms, temporarily freeing a convict he had befriended and who was working on the construction of the Ellis Park Stadium and also sneaking off from a formal dinner to go antelope hunting.

In early 1939 Mayne graduated from Queen's and joined George Maclaine & Co in Belfast, having been articled to TCG Mackintosh for the five previous years. Mayne won praise during the three Ireland matches he played in 1939, with one report stating "Mayne, whose quiet almost ruthless efficiency is in direct contrast to O'Loughlin's exuberance, appears on the slow side, but he covers the ground at an extraordinary speed for a man of his build, as many a three quarter and full back have discovered."

Second World War

Initial assignments
In March 1939, prior to the outbreak of the Second World War, Mayne had joined the Supplementary Reserve in Newtownards and received a commission in the Royal Artillery, being posted to 5 Light Anti-Aircraft Battery, in 8th Anti-Aircraft Regiment, later 8th (Belfast) Heavy Anti-Aircraft Regiment. When the battery was assigned to 9th Anti-Aircraft Regiment (later 9th (Londonderry) Heavy AA Regiment) for overseas' service, Mayne was transferred out to 66th Light AA Regiment in Northern Ireland. Then, in April 1940, he was transferred again, this time to the Royal Ulster Rifles.

Following Churchill's call to form a "butcher and bolt" raiding force following the Dunkirk evacuation, Mayne volunteered for the newly formed No. 11 (Scottish) Commando. He first saw action in June 1941 as a second-lieutenant with 11 Commando during the Syria–Lebanon Campaign. Mayne successfully led a section of men during the Battle of the Litani River in Lebanon against Vichy French Forces.  The operation was commanded by Major Dick Pedder, Highland Light Infantry, who was killed in action. Mayne played a distinguished part in the raid, for which he was awarded a mention in despatches.

Transfer to the SAS
Mayne's name was recommended to Captain David Stirling by his friend Lt. Eoin McGonigal, a fellow officer of No. 11 (Scottish) Commando, and an early volunteer for the Special Air Service (SAS); then known simply as the Parachute Unit. It is widely believed that Mayne was under arrest for hitting his commanding officer, Lieutenant Colonel Geoffrey Charles Tasker Keyes when Stirling met him. A hand-written entry in Keyes' personal diary states that he was not at the officer's mess of No. 11 (Scottish) Commando at Salamis on Cyprus on the evening of 21 June 1941, the date on which Mayne was accused of beating up a fellow officer, Major Charles Napier. Keyes had stayed the night elsewhere, and arrived at Salamis the following day, 22 June 1941, when the trouble was already over. Keyes states in his diary that he conducted an investigation and found Mayne responsible.

Keyes' diary makes it clear that Mayne was brought before the divisional commander, Brigadier Rodwell, on 23 June, for assaulting Napier, the second-in-command of his battalion. Mayne had a grudge against Napier, who had not taken part in the Litani raid, and who, according to a serving member of 11 Commando, had shot Mayne's pet dog while Mayne had been away. Mayne was attached to his pet, and was furious about this. Keyes' diary records that, on the evening of 21 June, after drinking heavily in the mess, Mayne waited by Napier's tent and assaulted him when he returned. Keyes also records in his diary that Mayne was dismissed from 11 Commando the following day, 23 June, but does not say that he was arrested.

SAS – 1941 and 1942
From November 1941 through to the end of 1942, Mayne participated in many night raids deep behind enemy lines in the deserts of Egypt and Libya, where the SAS wrought havoc by destroying many enemy aircraft on the ground. Mayne pioneered the use of military jeeps to conduct surprise hit-and-run raids, particularly on Axis airfields. It was claimed that he had personally destroyed up to 100 aircraft.

His first successful raid at Wadi Tamet on 14 December 1941, where aircraft and petrol dumps were destroyed, helped keep the SAS in existence, following the failure of the previous initial raid behind enemy lines. For his part in the Tamet raid Mayne was awarded the Distinguished Service Order (DSO). He also received a mention in despatches on 24 February 1942.

Mayne's official report on the Tamet raid notes:

Mayne took part in the most successful SAS raid of the desert war when, on the night of 26 July 1942, with eighteen armed jeeps, he and Stirling raided the Sidi Haneish Airfield. They avoided detection, destroyed up to 40 German aircraft and escaped with the loss of only three jeeps and two men killed.

Commanding officer
Following Stirling's capture in January 1943, 1st SAS Regiment was reorganised into two separate parts, the Special Raiding Squadron (SRS) and the Special Boat Section (the forerunner of the Special Boat Service). As a major, Mayne was appointed to command the Special Raiding Squadron and led the unit in Sicily and Italy until the end of 1943. In Sicily, Mayne was awarded a Bar to his DSO. The official citation reads as follows:

In January 1944 Mayne was promoted to lieutenant colonel and appointed commanding officer of the re-formed 1st SAS Regiment. He subsequently led the SAS with great distinction through the final campaigns of the war in France, the Netherlands, Belgium, Germany and Norway, often campaigning alongside local resistance fighters including the French Maquis. In recognition of his leadership and personal disregard for danger while in France, in which he trained and worked closely with the French Resistance, Mayne received the second Bar to his DSO. The official citation stated:

During the course of the war he became one of the British Army's most highly decorated soldiers and received the DSO with three Bars.

Recommendation for the Victoria Cross 
Mayne saw action during the campaigns in Sicily, Italy and Northwest Europe and later in the war he led two armoured jeep squadrons through the front lines toward Oldenburg. He rescued his wounded men and eliminated a German machine-gun position in a local village. A citation, approved by Field Marshal Bernard Montgomery, commander of the Allied 21st Army Group, was issued recommending Mayne for the Victoria Cross.

The success of his mission to clear a path for the 4th Canadian (Armoured) Division and sow disorganisation among the enemy was due to his "brilliant military leadership and cool calculating courage" and a "single act of bravery" which "drove the enemy from a strongly held key village thereby breaking the crust of the enemy defences in the whole of this sector." However, in a standard practice of the time, the award was downgraded to a lesser award, and Mayne instead received a third bar to the DSO (in other words, a fourth award of the DSO).

Major General Sir Robert Laycock, Postwar Chief of Combined Operations, wrote:

Mayne's contemporaries questioned why he was not awarded a Victoria Cross. The matter came to a head when, after a public campaign, the issue of a posthumous award was brought before the UK Parliament. An Early Day Motion put before the House of Commons in June 2005 and supported by more than 100 MPs also stated that:

The UK Government declined to re-open the case, though the Blair Mayne Association vowed to continue their campaign to have the Victoria Cross retrospectively awarded.

After the war

In 1945 Mayne was recruited to the Falkland Islands Dependencies Survey as deputy to expedition leader Edward W. Bingham. He visited the Falkland Islands, Deception Island and Port Lockroy.

Mayne returned to Newtownards to work first as a solicitor and then as Secretary to the Law Society of Northern Ireland. He suffered severe back pain which prevented him from even watching rugby as a spectator. He rarely talked about his wartime service.

On the night of Tuesday 13 December 1955, after attending a regular meeting of the Friendship Lodge, Mayne continued drinking with a masonic friend in the nearby town of Bangor, before making his way home in the early hours. At about 04:00 he was found dead in his Riley roadster in Mill Street, Newtownards, having reportedly collided with a farmer's vehicle.

At his funeral hundreds of mourners turned out to pay their respects and to see him interred in a family plot in the town's old Movilla Abbey graveyard. After his death his masonic jewel was preserved for many years by an old schoolfriend before it was presented to Newtownards Borough Council where it was displayed in the Mayoral Chamber of the Council Offices. A road in the town was later named in his honour and in 1997 a statue was dedicated to him outside the town hall.

Reputation
During the 1938 Lions tour it is said that Mayne relaxed by "wrecking hotels and fighting dockers".

Mayne is also described as growing increasingly withdrawn as the war progressed, preferring books to the company of friends. This tendency was said to have become more marked after the death of his father during the Second World War. Mayne was refused leave to attend the funeral and a story has him embarking on a drinking binge and rampage in central Cairo in an effort to find and beat up Richard Dimbleby.

Mayne was inclined to remonstrate with colleagues in the armed services who showed little or no understanding of the complex politics of Northern Ireland.

Legacy
A less-than-lifesize bronze statue of Blair Mayne stands in Conway Square, Newtownards. In 2003 a temporary British Army base in Kuwait, occupied by the first battalion of the Royal Irish Regiment, was named after him: Camp Blair Mayne. It was there that Lieutenant Colonel Tim Collins, 1 Battalion, the Royal Irish Regiment's commanding officer (himself a former SAS officer), gave his celebrated address to his troops on the eve of the 2003 invasion of Iraq.

Mayne is depicted by Jack O'Connell in the 2022 BBC television historical drama SAS: Rogue Heroes.

Honours and awards

See also
 List of SAS operations

References

Further reading

External links
 British Army Officers 1939–1945
 War Years Remembered Museum, Ballyclare, Co. Antrim – holds Mayne's Antarctic diary, photographs and some artefacts

1915 births
1955 deaths
British Army personnel of World War II
Alumni of Queen's University Belfast
Queen's University RFC players
Malone RFC players
Irish rugby union players
Ireland international rugby union players
British & Irish Lions rugby union players from Ireland
Ulster Rugby players
Companions of the Distinguished Service Order
Officiers of the Légion d'honneur
Male boxers from Northern Ireland
Irish Freemasons
Solicitors from Northern Ireland
People from Newtownards
Road incident deaths in Northern Ireland
Royal Artillery officers
Royal Ulster Rifles officers
Special Air Service officers
Recipients of the Croix de Guerre 1939–1945 (France)
British Army Commandos officers
People educated at Regent House Grammar School
Military personnel from County Down
Rugby union players from County Down